Samuel Atkinson Dobbins (April 14, 1814 – May 26, 1886) was a Republican Party politician who represented New Jersey's 2nd congressional district in the United States House of Representatives from 1873 to 1877. He served as the Sheriff of Burlington County, New Jersey from 1854 to 1857.

Biography
Dobbins was born near Vincentown in Southampton Township, New Jersey (in Burlington County) on April 14, 1814. He attended private and public schools, and engaged in agricultural pursuits. He moved to Mount Holly Township, New Jersey in 1838 and continued farming. He was high sheriff of Burlington County from 1854 to 1857, and served as a member of the New Jersey General Assembly from 1859 to 1861. He was a delegate to the 1864 Republican National Convention. Dobbins was a trustee of the Pennington Seminary from 1866 to 1886, serving as president of the board of trustees for ten years.

Dobbins was elected as a Republican to the Forty-third and Forty-fourth Congresses, serving in office from March 4, 1873 – March 3, 1877, but was not a candidate for renomination in 1876.

After leaving Congress, he resumed agricultural pursuits. He died in Mount Holly on May 26, 1886, and was interred in Mount Holly Cemetery.

External links

Samuel Atkinson Dobbins at The Political Graveyard

1814 births
1886 deaths
Republican Party members of the New Jersey General Assembly
People from Mount Holly, New Jersey
People from Southampton Township, New Jersey
Politicians from Burlington County, New Jersey
Republican Party members of the United States House of Representatives from New Jersey
19th-century American politicians